Fabritius is a North European surname and Latin given name. Bearers of the name include:

Dutch painter brothers
 Barent Fabritius (1624–1673)
 Carel Fabritius (1622–1654), painted A View of Delft and The Goldfinch
 Johannes Fabritius (1636–1693), mainly painted still lifes

Danish merchant family
 Just Fabritius (1703–1766), merchant
 Michael Fabritius (1697–1746), merchant and shipbuilder
 Fabritius de Tengnagel (noble family), originating in Brandenburg
 Conrad Fabritius de Tengnagel (1731–1805), merchant and arts patron
 Frederik Michael Ernst Fabritius de Tengnagel (1781–1849), military officer and landscape painter

Others of the surname
 Bernd Fabritius (born 1965), German Christian Social Union politician
 Carl Ferdinand Fabritius (1637–1673), German landscape painter
 Emil Fabritius (1874–1949), Finnish Olympic shooter
 Laurentius Fabritius (1535–1600), German Catholic bishop
 Ludvig Fabritius (1648–1729) Swedish ambassador to Safavid Iran 

Given name
 Fabritius Cocci (died 1606), Italian Catholic bishop

See also
 Fabricius (disambiguation)
 Fabrizio (disambiguation)